Colonel Redl ( (original title)) is a 1985 biographical drama film by Hungarian director István Szabó. The plot, set in the period before World War I, follows the rise of Alfred Redl, an officer in the Austro-Hungarian Empire. Redl, who comes from a humble background, enters military school as a boy and has an illustrious military career pushed forward by his loyalty to the crown. He is appointed the head of an intelligence-gathering unit, but his attraction to men eventually causes his downfall.

The screenplay, loosely inspired by British playwright John Osborne's play A Patriot for Me, charts the rise of inter-ethnic tensions in Austro-Hungary, which were to bring about the assassination in Sarajevo and the empire's eventual disintegration.

The film stars Klaus Maria Brandauer, Jan Niklas and Gudrun Landgrebe. It was nominated for an Academy Award for Best Foreign Film and won the Jury Prize at Cannes Film Festival in 1985.

Plot
Alfred Redl, a Ruthenian boy from Galicia in the Austro-Hungarian Empire,  wins an appointment to a prestigious military academy in spite of being the son of a mere peasant farmer. At his departure from home, his mother instils in him eternal gratitude towards Emperor Franz Josef. Redl is never to forget that he owes his promising career to the Emperor.
 
At the military academy, the young Redl soon stands out for his talent, drive and loyalty to the Crown. One of his teachers forces him to inform on Kristof Kubinyi, a student who is the subject of a practical joke; whilst he blames himself for incriminating his comrade, Alfred soon realises that to rise in the ranks he must overcome his peasant background by ingratiating himself with his superiors. Alfred and Kristof become firm friends. Kubinyi  invites Redl home for the holidays to the elegant residence of his parents, who lead a life of privilege and nobility in Hungary. There, Alfred meets Kristof's pretty sister, Katalin, who welcomes him warmly. To Kubinyi's aristocratic parents, Redl hides his true humble background, pretending to be of Hungarian ancestry and a member from an old family who lost all its fortune.

Redl and Kubinyi slowly climb the ladder as career officers. Once they become adults, the two friends have different political ideals. As a Hungarian, Kubinyi slowly falls prey to the national aspirations of a Hungary free from Habsburg rule, while Redl remains fiercely patriotic and faithful to his benefactor, the Austrian Emperor.  For Redl, his relationship with Kubinyi goes beyond friendship as Redl harbors an unrequited love for his comrade. When the two young men visit a brothel, Redl seems more interested in watching his friend having sex than in engaging a woman in his own room. Redl suppresses his attraction to Kristof, however, and transfers it, as best as he can, to Katalin, his friend's beautiful sister. Back at the academy, Alfred serves as a second in a duel between Kristof and another classmate, who is killed in the contest. This foolishness jeopardizes the careers of both Kubinyi and Redl, but the commanding officer, Colonel von Roden, having noted Redl's hard work and loyalty to the Emperor, arranges a promotion for him and a prized assignment in Vienna. In Vienna, Redl is able to renew his friendship with Katalin, who is, by then, unhappily married. They become lovers in spite of Katalin knowing well that it is her brother who Alfred really loves.                                                                                                                               
                                                                              
Redl is assigned to a garrison serving on the Russian border. The discipline there is lax and Redl readily stands out as a serious-minded young officer. When the district commander decides to retire, Redl is recommended for the job. As commanding officer, he proves very demanding, working hard to reinvigorate the discipline of his outfit. This does not sit well with the junior officers, including Kristof, especially because they feel superior to Redl by birth. When Redl and Kristof have a falling out over Kristof's sloppy habits and poor performance, Kristof mocks Redl's lowly origins in conversation with other officers.

Colonel von Roden intervenes on Redl's behalf again, bringing him back to Vienna to serve as deputy chief of the counter-espionage branch of the Evidenzbureau. It's a nasty kind of job, since it entails spying on officers throughout the service, trying to identify those engaging in espionage activities for the Russians. On Katalin's suggestion, Redl undertakes a loveless marriage of convenience in order to quell rumors of his homosexual proclivities. His wife, Clarissa, suffers from ill health and remains a distant figure in his life.

Redl's single-minded devotion to duty draws him into the orbit of the heir to the crown, Archduke Franz Ferdinand, who is a ruthless schemer (whose ultimate objective is portrayed as to overthrow the Emperor in a coup d'état). Redl participates in one of the Archduke's plots, which involves setting up an aging Ukrainian officer for a dramatic fall so as to shake the army out of its complacency. The man is accidentally shot to death, however, during the search and seizure, negating the value of the plan. The Archduke then decides to make Redl the fall guy instead. Redl contributes to his own downfall by allowing himself to be seduced by an Italian officer. Redl is now doomed. Under arrest, he is given a service pistol with which to take his own life. It falls upon Kristof to provide Redl with the gun and order him to commit suicide. After experiencing anger, hesitation and despair, Redl finally shoots himself. The film ends with a brief depiction of the notorious assassination of the Archduke at Sarajevo, and the resulting chain of events leading to World War I.

Cast
 Klaus Maria Brandauer as Colonel Alfred Redl
 Hans Christian Blech as Major General Von Roden
 Armin Mueller-Stahl as Archduke Franz Ferdinand
 Gudrun Landgrebe as  Katalin Kubinyi
 Jan Niklas as Colonel Kristóf Kubinyi
 László Mészáros as Colonel Ruzitska
 András Bálint as Captain Dr. Gustav Sonnenschein
 László Gálffi as Alfredo Velocchio
 Dorottya Udvaros as Clarissa
 Károly Eperjes as Lieutenant Jaromil Schorm
 Róbert Rátonyi as Baron Ullmann
 Flóra Kádár as Redl's sister

Accuracy

The film has several inaccuracies. Redl is said to be a Ruthenian, while in fact his family was of German-Czech origin. Redl is shown as coming from a poor family. In fact, he came from a middle-class background, as his father was a senior employee of the railways. Redl's sister is shown as a poor illiterate peasant woman; in actuality, she was a school-teacher.

Franz Ferdinand's supposed plot against Redl is fictional.

Redl was homosexual; however, he was not forced into suicide directly because of this. In fact, he was a spy in the pay of the Imperial Russian government, who had blackmailed him over his homosexuality. When Redl's treachery was uncovered, he was encouraged to commit suicide.

Awards
The film won the BAFTA Award for Best Foreign Language Film. It was nominated for an Academy Award for Best Foreign Language Film, but lost to The Official Story.

It won the Jury Prize at the 1985 Cannes Film Festival.

See also
 List of submissions to the 58th Academy Awards for Best Foreign Language Film
 List of Hungarian submissions for the Academy Award for Best Foreign Language Film

References

External links 
 
 
 
 

1985 films
1980s biographical drama films
1985 LGBT-related films
1980s spy films
Austrian biographical drama films
Austrian LGBT-related films
Best Foreign Language Film BAFTA Award winners
Cultural depictions of Archduke Franz Ferdinand of Austria
Films about suicide
German films based on plays
Films based on works by John Osborne
Films directed by István Szabó
Films set in Austria
Films set in the 1900s
Films set in the 1910s
1980s German-language films
German LGBT-related films
German spy drama films
Hungarian biographical drama films
1980s Hungarian-language films
Hungarian LGBT-related films
Secret histories
West German films
1980s historical drama films
German historical drama films
Austrian historical drama films
Cultural depictions of Gavrilo Princip
1985 drama films
Films set in Austria-Hungary
Biographical films about military personnel
1985 multilingual films
Austrian multilingual films
German multilingual films
Hungarian multilingual films
1980s German films
LGBT-related biographical films